Charlotte Sheffield (September 1, 1936 - April 15, 2016) was an American actress, model and beauty pageant titleholder best known as Miss USA 1957.

After winning the Miss Utah USA crown, Sheffield, from Salt Lake City, Utah was first runner-up in the Miss USA competition. A day later, the winner, Mary Leona Gage was stripped of her title when it emerged that she was not only too young to compete (18 years old; the age limit was 21), but was also married with two children. Sheffield ascended as Miss USA, but was not allowed to compete for the Miss Universe 1957 crown. By the time Gage's deceit was discovered, Sheffield had already missed the preliminary competition. Sheffield went on to compete at the 1957 Miss World pageant, but failed to place.

Charlotte then married Richard Maxfield and had 8 children, four boys and four girls. She was a member of the Mormon Tabernacle Choir for ten years and acted in many plays and movies. She was a special guest at the Miss USA pageant several times through the years. She was most recently seen as a special guest in Las Vegas at the 2011 Miss USA pageant.

In 1958, Sheffield starred alongside Bret Morrison in a science fiction radio drama The Adventure of the Beauty Queen, as a part of the Exploring Tomorrow radio series. Her last film was Stand Strong, released in 2011. The trailer is featured on YouTube under that title. She is seen in the trailer several times.

Charlotte died in 2016 in Salt Lake City, UT due to Legionnaires' disease.

References

External links

Miss USA official website

1937 births
2016 deaths
American film actresses
Latter Day Saints from Utah
American radio actresses
Miss USA 1950s delegates
Miss USA winners
Miss World 1957 delegates
Tabernacle Choir members
Actresses from Salt Lake City